Giuseppe Maimone (born 2 March 1994) is an Italian football player. He plays for Lamezia Terme.

Club career
He made his Serie C debut for Reggina on 19 September 2014 in a game against Lecce.

On 24 August 2018, he joined Monopoli on loan for the 2018–19 season.

On 19 July 2019, he signed with Sicula Leonzio.

On 18 August 2020 he moved to Picerno.

On 1 October 2020 he joined Bisceglie.

References

External links
 

1994 births
People from Taormina
Living people
Italian footballers
Reggina 1914 players
A.C. Cuneo 1905 players
A.S. Melfi players
U.S. Lecce players
Matera Calcio players
S.S. Monopoli 1966 players
A.S.D. Sicula Leonzio players
A.S. Bisceglie Calcio 1913 players
F.C. Lamezia Terme players
Serie C players
Serie D players
Association football midfielders
Sportspeople from the Province of Messina
Footballers from Sicily